Toges may refer to:

 Touge (Japanese: 峠, tôge)
 Toges, a commune of the Ardennes département, in France